Bonifácio: O Fundador do Brasil (en: Boniface: The Founder of Brazil) is a Brazilian documentary about the life, work and thoughts of the Patriarch of Independence of Brazil, José Bonifácio de Andrada e Silva. It is a production of IVIN Films.

It is directed by Mauro Ventura and the participation of personalities from Brazil and Portugal, such as Bertrand de Orléans e Bragança and Olavo de Carvalho.

It was the largest crowdfunding in the history of Brazilian cinema.

It premiered on June 6, 2018, in cinemas in São Paulo, Rio de Janeiro and Porto Alegre.

External links 
 Official website
 YouTube

References 

Brazilian documentary films
2018 documentary films